Matthew Dixon may refer to:

Matthew Dixon (British Army officer) (1821–1905), recipient of the Victoria Cross
Matthew Dixon (diver) (born 2000), English diver 
Matt Dixon (born 1992), Australian cricketer
Matty Dixon (born 1994), English footballer